Last American Rock Stars is the debut studio album by American hip hop duo L.A.R.S., which consists of Detroit-based rappers Bizarre (of D12) and King Gordy (of the Fat Killahz). It was released on February 16, 2018, through Majik Ninja Entertainment. It features guest appearances from Boobie Trapp, Fury, G-Mo Skee, Trizz, Twista, and Twiztid. The album debuted at number six on the US Billboard Heatseekers Albums.

Music videos for "Suicide" and "Lit" were directed by Nick Margetic.

Track listing

Charts

References

2018 debut albums
King Gordy albums
Bizarre (rapper) albums
Albums produced by Mr. Porter
Majik Ninja Entertainment albums
Albums produced by Seven (record producer)